Trophy Eyes is an Australian punk rock band from Newcastle, formed in 2013. They are currently signed to Hopeless Records. The band currently consists of vocalist John Floreani, bassist and backing vocalist Jeremy Winchester, lead guitarist Andrew Hallett, and drummer Blake Caruso.  Their single "Hurt"  was ranked No. 135 on Triple J's Hottest 100. Other Hottest 100 appearances include No. 101 in 2016 with "Chlorine" and No. 93 in 2018 with "You Can Count On Me". To date, they have released three studio albums: Mend, Move On (2014), Chemical Miracle (2016),  and The American Dream (2018).

History

Early years and Everything Goes Away (2013–2014)
Trophy Eyes was formed in 2013 by Andrew Hallett on lead guitar, Kevin Cross on rhythm guitar, Jeremy Winchester on bass and backing vocals, Callum Cramp on drums, and John Floreani on vocals. They later released an EP, Demo 2013, on 8 April 2013, which consisted of two tracks, "Chacho" and "Personal Taste". Everything Goes Away has five songs and it was written about a period of his life during which he lived in his high school town prior to moving to Newcastle. It was released on 29 April 2014. On the same day, a music video for their single "Hourglass" was released.

Mend, Move On and Chemical Miracle (2014–2016)
On 17 September, their single "In Return" was released alongside an accompanying music video. On 9 October, they released a second single "White Curtains" and another music video. On 24 October, their third single "Penfold State Forest" was released.

In just under a year after the release of Everything Goes Away, they released their debut studio album, Mend, Move On was released on 4 November 2014 under Hopeless Records. The album was recorded at Karma Sound Studios in Thailand with Shane Edwards, as would their next two albums.

The band released a non-album single called "Tired Hearts" in September 2015.

Trophy Eyes performed at the 2015 Vans Warped Tour on the Hard Rock stage and Full Sail stage. They shared a stage with bands like Emarosa, Have Mercy, Knuckle Puck, and Palisades.

The band's sophomore studio album, Chemical Miracle released on 14 October 2016. Like their other album, this one was also recorded in Thailand by Shane Edwards.

Cramp's departure and The American Dream (2017–2019)
At Warped Tour 2017, they played alongside bands such as Knocked Loose, Boston Manor, and Movements. They have also toured the United Kingdom with Welsh band Neck Deep, American band Knuckle Puck and Canadian band Seaway on the Intercontinental Championships Tour. This tour lasted from 26 January to 6 February.

In October, long-time drummer Callum Cramp announced his departure from the band. Personal tensions between Cramp and the band were cited as the reason he left. "Hurt", the band's first single without Cramp, was released on 8 November 2017.

From 24 November to 17 December, the band embarked on their first US headlining tour with support from Free Throw, Grayscale, and Head North. Blake Caruso filled in for drums on this tour before officially joining the band.

On 29 March 2018, they joined the line-up of Australia's first Download Festival in Melbourne.

On 29 May 2018, the single "You Can Count On Me" was released alongside an accompanying music video. On 31 July, the second single, "Friday Forever" was released alongside an accompanying music video. Trophy Eyes' third studio album, The American Dream, was released on 3 August. A music video for their track "Lavender Bay", was released on 14 November.

Cross' departure and "Figure Eight" (2019–Present) 
In April 2019, Trophy Eyes performed as a support act for Bring Me the Horizon during the Australian leg of their First Love Tour alongside You Me At Six and Frank Carter & The Rattlesnakes. On 16 July, the band announced that founding guitarist Kevin Cross will leave the band after they perform at Splendour in the Grass that Saturday.

On 15 January 2020 the band released the single, "Figure Eight", their first new single since The American Dream. Unlike their other songs, "Figure Eight" features the addition of a saxophone, which is rumoured to be played by bassist Jeremy Winchester. Blake Caruso confirmed on Twitter that the single would not be on the upcoming album.

On October 28, 2021, Trophy Eyes released a new single, "27 Club". They then released further singles, "Bittersweet" on December 1, 2021 and "Nobody Said" on February 8, 2022.

Members
Current
 John Floreani – lead vocals 
 
 Jeremy Winchester – bass, saxophone, backing vocals 
 Blake Caruso – drums 

Former
 Callum Cramp – drums 
 Kevin Cross – rhythm guitar 
 Andrew Hallett – lead guitar

Timeline

Discography

Albums

Extended plays

Singles

Music videos

References

New South Wales musical groups
Hopeless Records artists
Australian pop punk groups